Charles Erich Conrad (May 23, 1925 – October 29, 2009) was an American actor and acting coach.

Born in New York City, the only child of German immigrants, Charles Conrad spent his early years growing up in New York City. At the age of 17, he  joined the Navy  where he served as an armed guard on Merchant ships during World War II. He subsequently studied theater directing at the Carnegie Institute of Technology (now part of Carnegie Mellon University). In 1952, he began studying the craft of acting with Sanford Meisner at the Neighborhood Playhouse.

He subsequently moved to California, where he opened his own studio (CEC Studio) in Burbank. He taught using his own refinements of the  Meisner Technique.

He died, aged 84, from kidney failure on October 29, 2009.

References

Sources
 Judy Kerr. "Acting Is Everything: An Actor's Guidebook for a Successful Career in Los Angeles" (11th ed; 2006). September Publishing;

External links
The Neighborhood Playhouse

1925 births
2009 deaths
Drama teachers
Male actors from New York City
American people of German descent
Deaths from kidney failure
Carnegie Mellon University alumni